Pangrio is a town located in the district of Badin in Sindh, Pakistan.

References

Populated places in Badin District